Fergal Healy (born 21 September 1977 in Craughwell, County Galway) is an Irish hurler who plays for his local club Craughwell and, formerly, at senior level for the Galway county team from 1997–2009.

Playing career

Club

Healy played his club hurling with his local club in Craughwell. He started to play with the club when he was seven years-old and went on to play in county under-14 and under-16 finals before helping the club to an historic under-21 county championship breakthrough in the mid-1990s. Healy, however, has never won a senior county title with his club.

Inter-county

Healy came to prominence on the inter-county scene with Galway at an early age.  As a member of the county's under-14 team he captured a Tony Forrestal Cup winners' medal in the early 1990s.  Healy was later chosen on the Galway under-16 team, with whom he collected a Nenagh Co-Op title.

Healy subsequently became a member of the Galway minor team.  In 1993, Galway qualified for the All-Ireland final, however, Healy was not a member of the starting fifteen. He did enter the field of play as a substitute, however, Galway were defeated by Kilkenny on that occasion. In 1994, Galway were back in the All-Ireland minor final once again, with Healy lining out on the half-forward line.  Cork provided the opposition on this occasion, and Galway emerged victorious by 2-10 to 1-11.  It was Healy's first All-Ireland medal.  Healy played with the Galway minor again in 1995, however, the team's championship involvement ended at the semi-final stage.

In 1996 Healy was eligible to play with the Galway under-21 hurling team.  That year the county reached the All-Ireland final in that grade.  Wexford were the opponents in that game, over whom Galway had a 1-14 to 0-7 victory.  It was Healy's first All-Ireland medal in the under-21 grade.  In 1997, Galway qualified for the All-Ireland final once again.  This time Cork provided the opposition and it was Cork who claimed the victory at the full-time whistle.  1998 saw Healy line out in a third consecutive All-Ireland under-21 final.  Cork were the opponents once again, and it was Cork who emerged victorious by 2-15 to 2-10.

1996 also saw Healy have success with the Galway junior hurling team.  That year Healy's county reached the All-Ireland final in that competition.  Kilkenny provided the opposition on that occasion, however, it was Galway who took a 1-14 2-9.  This gave Healy an All-Ireland title at junior level.

Healy made his competitive debut with the Galway senior hurling team in 1997.  It took him a few years, however, before he established himself on the championship team.

In 1999 Galway qualified for the final of the National Hurling League competition.  Tipperary provided the opposition on that occasion, and it was Tipperary who emerged victorious by 1-14 to 1-10.  1999 also saw Healy win with the Galway intermediate hurling team.  That year Healy's county reached the All-Ireland final in that competition.  Kilkenny provided the opposition on that occasion, with Galway winning 3-13 to 2-10.  This gave Healy an All-Ireland title at intermediate level.

2000 saw Galway reach the National League final for a second year in-a-row.  Tipperary were the opponents once again. Galway won 2-18 to 2-13, giving Healy his first major title at senior level.  Later that same year Healy made his senior championship debut in an All-Ireland quarter-final against Tipperary.  Galway recorded a victory on that occasion. Galway were defeated by Kilkenny in the subsequent All-Ireland semi-final.

In 2001, Galway reached the All-Ireland final.  Tipperary were the opponents, and Healy had a good game in the forward line.  He scored a goal for Galway and hit the post twice, however, Mark O'Leary's two goals gave Tipperary the threshold to withstand a Galway fight-back. At the full-time whistle Tipperary were the victors by 2-18 to 2-15.

Galway went through a barren spell following this appearance in the championship decider.  In 2005 Galway beat Kilkenny in the All-Ireland semi-final to book a spot in the All-Ireland final with Cork.  A Ben O'Connor goal in the sixteenth minute paved the way for a Cork victory, in spite of a Damien Hayes goal reducing the deficit to one point.  Galway failed to score in the last ten minutes as Cork recorded a 1-21 to 1-16 victory.

In 2006 and 2007 Kilkenny defeated Galway in the All-Ireland quarter-finals.  In 2008 Healy's side failed to beat fourteen-man Cork, thus not even reaching the All-Ireland quarter-final.

Provincial

Healy has also lined out with Connacht in the inter-provincial competition.  He won a Railway Cup winners' medal in 2004 as Connacht defeated Munster in the final.

References

1977 births
Living people
Craughwell hurlers
Galway inter-county hurlers
Connacht inter-provincial hurlers